The Supreme Court of the United States handed down thirteen per curiam opinions during its 2011 term, which began October 3, 2011 and concluded September 30, 2012.

Because per curiam decisions are issued from the Court as an institution, these opinions all lack the attribution of authorship or joining votes to specific justices. All justices on the Court at the time the decision was handed down are assumed to have participated and concurred unless otherwise noted.

Court membership

Chief Justice: John Roberts

Associate Justices: Antonin Scalia, Anthony Kennedy, Clarence Thomas, Ruth Bader Ginsburg, Stephen Breyer, Samuel Alito, Sonia Sotomayor, Elena Kagan

Cavazos v. Smith

KPMG LLP v. Cocchi

Bobby v. Dixon

Hardy v. Cross

Perry v. Perez

Ryburn v. Huff

Wetzel v. Lambert

Marmet Health Care Center, Inc. v. Brown

Coleman v. Johnson

Parker v. Matthews

American Tradition Partnership, Inc. v. Bullock

Tennant v. Jefferson County

See also 
 List of United States Supreme Court cases, volume 565
 List of United States Supreme Court cases, volume 566
 List of United States Supreme Court cases, volume 567

Notes

References

 

United States Supreme Court per curiam opinions
Lists of 2011 term United States Supreme Court opinions
2011 per curiam